Sizzle Pie is a pizza restaurant chain based in Portland, Oregon, United States.

Pizza Party HQ is a brand of Sizzle Pie.

History
As part of the COVID-19 pandemic, the company received between $1 million and $2 million in federally backed small business loans from Heritage Bank as part of the Paycheck Protection Program.

Locations

Sizzle Pie entered the Seattle market in 2016. In 2017, Sizzle Pie replaced Atomic Pizza at Portland's Hollywood Theatre. In late 2017, the chain's two locations in Brooklyn (Greenpoint and Williamsburg) closed, after operating for less than one year. There is also a location in downtown Reno, Nevada.

See also
 List of companies based in Oregon
 List of pizza chains of the United States
 Pizza in Portland, Oregon

References

External links

 

Food and drink companies based in Portland, Oregon
Italian restaurants in the United States
Pizza chains of the United States
Pizzerias in Portland, Oregon
Pizzerias in New York City